1881 in sports describes the year's events in world sports.

Athletics
USA Outdoor Track and Field Championships

American football
College championship
 College football national championship – Yale Bulldogs 
Events
 Michigan Wolverines is the first "western" team to travel east and play against the established teams at Harvard Crimson, Yale Bulldogs and Princeton Tigers.

Association football
England
 FA Cup final – Old Carthusians 3–0 Old Etonians at The Oval in the last final to be played between two southern amateur sides.
 Blackburn Rovers and Bolton Wanderers both change their venues to enclosed grounds where gate money can be charged, an increasing practice among clubs that are openly (or otherwise) professional.
 Preston North End is founded and plays from the start at Deepdale, which holds the world record for the length of time a venue has been in continuous use by one major league club.
 Burnley FC founded as Burnley Rovers RUFC which decides in May 1882 to switch codes.  The Rovers suffix is dropped two years later and the club renamed as Burnley AFC. 
 Newcastle United, which has a complicated early history, is founded as Stanley FC by a cricket club in the Byker area of Newcastle.
France
 Foundation of FC Girondins de Bordeaux.
Ireland
 Moyola Park F.C. wins the inaugural Irish Cup final
Scotland
 12 March — Andrew Watson makes his Scotland debut, becoming the world's first black international football player
 Scottish Cup final – Queen's Park 3–1 Dumbarton at Hampden Park (replay after Dumbarton protests about the original match which Queen's Park has won 2–1)

Baseball
National championship
 National League champions – Chicago White Stockings
Events
 Detroit replaces Cincinnati leaving Cleveland and Providence the southerly cities on the National League circuit.  Four others lie on the northerly rail line from stalwart Chicago to stalwart Boston: Detroit, Buffalo, Troy, and Worcester.
 In autumn, for the first time, all eight National League clubs prepare to continue next season.

Boxing
Events
 Paddy Ryan takes part in a number of exhibition bouts but does not defend his Heavyweight Championship of America title.
 John L. Sullivan continues his rise to the championship with a series of knockout victories, none of them lasting longer than eight rounds.

Cricket
Events
 Lancashire County Cricket Club wins its first outright title.  At the end of the season, an English team led by Alfred Shaw goes to Australia for the 1881–82 Test series.
England
 Champion County –  Lancashire
 Most runs – A. N. Hornby 1,534 @ 40.36 (HS 188)
 Most wickets – Ted Peate 173 @ 12.68 (BB 8–30)
Australia
 Most runs – Tom Horan 318 @ 35.33 (HS 113)
 Most wickets – Edwin Evans 32 @ 11.25 (BB 5–34)

Golf
Major tournaments
 British Open – Bob Ferguson

Gymnastics
Events
 23 July — the Federation Internationale de Gymnastique, the world's oldest international sport federation, is founded.

Horse racing
England
 Grand National – Woodbrook
 1,000 Guineas Stakes – Thebais 
 2,000 Guineas Stakes – Peregrine
 The Derby – Iroquois
 The Oaks – Thebais 
 St. Leger Stakes – Iroquois
Australia
 Melbourne Cup – Zulu
Canada
 Queen's Plate – Vice Chancellor
Ireland
 Irish Grand National – Antoinette
 Irish Derby Stakes – Master Ned
USA
 Kentucky Derby – Hindoo
 Preakness Stakes – Saunterer
 Belmont Stakes – Saunterer

Rowing
The Boat Race
 8 April — Oxford wins the 38th Oxford and Cambridge Boat Race

Rugby football
Events
 Wales plays its first international match but is well beaten by England

Tennis
England
 Wimbledon Men's Singles Championship – William Renshaw (GB) defeated John Hartley (GB) 6–0 6–1 6–1
USA
 First U.S. National Singles Championship, precursor of the US Open, won by Richard D. Sears (USA) who defeats William E. Glyn (USA) 6–0 6–3 6–2

World
The 6th pre-open era 1881 Men's Tennis season gets underway 65 tournaments are staged this year from 4  April to 10 November.

Yacht racing
America's Cup
 The New York Yacht Club retains the America's Cup as Mischief defeats Canadian challenger Atalanta, of the Bay of Quinte Yacht Club

References

 
Sports by year